Oleksiі Cheremisin (born 4 January 1991 in Kyiv, in the Ukrainian SSR) is a professional Ukrainian football defender who played for FK Slavoj Vyšehrad in the Bohemian Football League.

Cheremisin is a product of the youth team systems of FC Dynamo Kyiv. He did not play in the first Dynamo's team and signed a contract with FC Obolon in 2009.

He was called up to play for the Ukraine national under-21 football team by trainer Pavlo Yakovenko to the Commonwealth Cup in 2012.

References

External links
Profile at FFU Official Site (Ukr)

1991 births
Living people
Ukrainian footballers
FC Obolon-Brovar Kyiv players
FC Dynamo Khmelnytskyi players
FC Olimpik Donetsk players
FC Zirka Kropyvnytskyi players
Ukrainian Premier League players
Ukrainian expatriate footballers
Expatriate footballers in the Czech Republic
Association football defenders
Footballers from Kyiv